The following is an introductory partial list in a series of Recorded Texas Historic Landmarks (RTHLs) arranged by county as designated by the Texas Historical Commission and local county historical commissions in Texas. This initial page includes RTHLs in the following counties: Anderson, Andrews, Angelina, Aransas, Archer, Armstrong, Atascosa, Austin, Bailey, Bandera, Bastrop, Baylor, Bee, Bell, Bexar, Blanco, Borden, Bosque, Bowie, Brazoria, Brazos, Brewster, Briscoe, Brooks, Brown, Burleson, Burnet, Caldwell, Calhoun, and Callahan.

KEY 

Landmarks with multiple historic designations are colored according to their highest designation within the following hierarchy.

Anderson County

Andrews County

Angelina County

Aransas County

Archer County

Armstrong County

Atascosa County

Austin County

Bailey County

Bandera County

Bastrop County

Baylor County

Bee County

Bell County

Bexar County

Blanco County

Borden County

Bosque County

Bowie County

Brazoria County

Brazos County

Brewster County

Briscoe County

Brooks County

Brown County

Burleson County

Burnet County

Caldwell County

Calhoun County

Callahan County

See also

References

External links

 (Anderson-Callahan)
Landmarks